Iosif Gavrilovich Yesman (December 1 1868, Vileyka – July 1 1955, Baku) was a Soviet and Russian scientist in the field of hydraulics. He was a full member, one of the founders (1945), and director of the Institute of Power Engineering (1945–1955) at the Azerbaijan National Academy of Sciences.

Yesman was a power engineering specialist. He was an honored scientist of Azerbaijan in 1929.

References

1868 births
1955 deaths
Academic staff of Peter the Great St. Petersburg Polytechnic University
Academic staff of Tbilisi State University
Recipients of the Order of Lenin
Recipients of the Order of the Red Banner of Labour
Recipients of the Order of the Red Star
Azerbaijani engineers

Soviet engineers